Kūlolo is a Hawaiian dessert made primarily with baked or steamed grated taro corms and either with grated coconut meat or coconut milk. Considered a pudding, kūlolo has a solid consistency like fudge and is often served cut into squares. Its consistency is also described as chewy and lumpy like tapioca, and it tastes similar to caramel.

Traditional kūlolo recipes call for wrapping the mixture in ti leaves and baking it in an imu (underground oven) for 6 to 8 hours. Modern recipes call for placing the mixture in a baking pan, covering it with aluminum foil, and baking in a standard oven for about 1–2 hours.

See also
 Haupia
 Dodol
 List of dishes using coconut milk

References

External links
 A description of preparing kulolo from pacificworlds.com

Hawaiian desserts
Puddings
Polynesian cuisine